The kalyuka (or kolyuka, Russian: калюка, колюка) is a Russian and Ukrainian overtone flute, lacking playing holes. Traditionally, kalyukas were made from hollow plant stems, such as motherwort, or angelica. Modern versions of the instrument are usually made from PVC, an inexpensive and durable substitute.

The upper end of the kalyuka is open, and although it has a built-in fipple to produce sound, a player should also partly close the opening of the tube with the tongue. The lower end of the tube is also open and occasionally there is a small side hole near the end.  The side hole and/or end are opened and closed while playing to produce different notes (like the Slovak koncovka). Higher tones are reached through over blowing.

In Eastern traditions, the kalyuka was played on summer evenings after the hay harvest when the suitable weeds, cut with a scythe, were available to make one, and was accompanied by percussion instruments.

The existence of the tradition was uncovered in 1980 by students of the Moscow and St. Petersburg Conservatories.

Bibliography
Ivanov A.N. Volshebnaia fleita yuzhnorusskogo folklora. Sokhranenie i vozrozhdenie folklornykh traditsyi. 2nd edition. Moscow, 1993.
Banin A.A. Russkaia instrumentalnaia muzyka folklornoi traditsii. Moscow, 1997. (p. 85)

References

Overtone flutes
Russian musical instruments